VCS may refer to:

Video games
 Atari VCS or Atari 2600 video game console
 Atari VCS (2021 console), microconsole
 Grand Theft Auto: Vice City Stories
 Vietnam Championship Series of video sports

Technology
 Veritas Cluster Server
 Version control system, for managing versions of software, etc.
 virtual camera system, interactive cameras based on artificial intelligence
 Virtual Cluster Switching, networking technology
 VCalendar file extension

Other uses
 The Villages Charter Schools, Sumter County, Florida, US
 Valley Christian School, Dublin, California, US
 Verkehrs-Club der Schweiz, a Swiss transport association
 International Christian School of Vienna, Austria
 Verified Carbon Standard, for carbon emissions
 Con Dao Airport IATA code